The 2019 Asian Women's U23 Volleyball Championship was the 3rd edition of the Asian Women's U23 Volleyball Championship, a biennial international volleyball tournament organised by the Asian Volleyball Confederation (AVC). It was held in Hanoi, Vietnam from July 13 to 21, 2019.

Pools composition

Pool standing procedure
 Numbers of matches won
 Match points
 Sets ratio
 Points ratio
 Result of the last match between the tied teams

Match won 3–0 or 3–1: 3 match points for the winner, 0 match points for the loser.  
Match won 3–2: 2 match points for the winner, 1 match point for the loser.

Venues

Squads

Preliminary round
All times are Vietnam Standard Time (UTC+07:00).

Group A

|}

|}

Group B

|}

|}

Group C

|}

|}

Group D

|}

|}

Second round
The results and the points of the matches between the same teams that were already played during the preliminary round shall be taken into account for the classification round
All times are Vietnam Standard Time (UTC+07:00).

Pool E

|}

|}

Pool F

|}

|}

Pool G

|}

|}

Pool H

|}

|}

Classification round
All Times are Vietnam Standard Time (UTC+07:00).

Classification 9th–12th
 W: Withdrawn

9th–12th semifinals

|}

11th place match

|}

9th place match

|}

Final round
All times are Vietnam Standard Time (UTC+07:00).

Quarterfinals

|}

5th–8th semifinals

|}

Semifinals

|}

7th place

|}

5th place

|}

3rd place

 
|}

Final

|}

Final standing

Medalists

Awards
Most Valuable Player
 Wu Han

Best Opposite Spiker
 Sun Jie

Best Outside Spikers
 Son Hyang Mi
 Trần Thị Thanh Thúy

Best Middle Blocker
 Gao Yi
 Nguyễn Thị Trinh

Best Setter
 Ri Jong Hyang

Best Libero
 Jidapa Nahuanong

Broadcasting rights

See also
 2019 Asian Men's U23 Volleyball Championship

References

External links
Official website
Regulations
Teams composition

U23, 2017
Women's volleyball in Vietnam
2019 in women's volleyball
International volleyball competitions hosted by Vietnam
2019 in Vietnamese sport
July 2019 sports events in Asia